The  was a battle of the Genpei War of the Heian period of Japanese history. It took place in 1180, in what is now Shizuoka Prefecture.

Background 
Minamoto no Yoritomo, using Kamakura as his headquarters, sent  his counselor Hōjō Tokimasa in August 1180 to convince the warlords Takeda of Kai and Nitta of Kotsuke to follow Yoritomo's command as he marched against the Taira.  

As Yoritomo continued through the region below Mount Fuji and into Suruga Province, he planned a rendezvous with the Takeda clan and other families of the provinces of Kai and Kōzuke to the north. These allies arrived at the rear of the Taira army in time to ensure a Minamoto victory.

Battle 
During the night, Yoritomo launched an attack against the large Taira army camp.  The Taira became alarmed when a flock of waterfowl flew over their camp, and the "small surprise became a rout".

See also 
 The Tale of the Heike

References

Further reading
 Turnbull, Stephen (1998). The Samurai Sourcebook. London: Cassell & Co.

1180s in Japan
1180 in Asia
Fujigawa 1180
Fujikawa